Sanford Health is a nonprofit, integrated health care delivery system headquartered in Sioux Falls, South Dakota, with additional offices in Fargo and Bismarck, North Dakota, and Bemidji, Minnesota.

History 
Sanford Health has its roots in the Dakotas at the beginning of the 20th century, with Sioux Falls Hospital opening in Sioux Falls in 1894 and St. Luke's Hospital opening in Fargo in 1908. Over the next 80 years, both hospitals grew in size and influence, becoming integrated hospital-clinic systems known as Sioux Valley Health System and MeritCare Health System. The Sioux Valley Health System was renamed Sanford Health in 2007 after T. Denny Sanford's $400 million gift to the organization. On November 2, 2009, Sanford took over MeritCare. Additional mergers with North Country Regional Health in Bemidji, Minnesota, and Medcenter One Health Systems followed in 2011 and 2012.

Medcenter One Health Systems
Medcenter One Health Systems was a nonprofit American health care provider headquartered in Bismarck, North Dakota. Medcenter One offered nine clinics, three long-term care facilities, and multiple hospital affiliations. It was designated as a Level II trauma center. It was bought and merged into Sanford Health in 2012.

The Evangelical Lutheran Good Samaritan Society
In 2017, talks began to form an affiliation agreement between Sanford and the Good Samaritan Society. After discussions and the formation of synergy teams that strategized how the organizations could combine, final votes were taken by both parties to the agreement. On April 26, 2018, the Society Board of Directors voted that the Society Membership consider approving the affiliation agreement. On June 21, the Sanford Board of Trustees voted to approve the affiliation agreement. On June 26, the Society Membership voted to approve the affiliation agreement. A press conference was held later that day during which Sanford Health President and CEO Kelby Krabbenhoft and Society President and CEO David Horazdovsky signed the affiliation agreement. It was announced that the affiliation would then go into regulatory review with an expected approval date of January 1, 2019. If approved, The Evangelical Lutheran Good Samaritan Society would change its name to The Evangelical Lutheran Good Samaritan Society of Sanford Health. Sanford Health would retain its name. The affiliation agreement met the requirements of regulatory review earlier than expected, with an announcement on August 17, 2018. The merger completed on January 1, 2019.

Intermountain Healthcare 
In October 2020, Intermountain Healthcare and Sanford Health signed an intent to merge. The merger would make Sanford Health a subsidiary of Intermountain Healthcare with the resulting system consisting of 70 hospitals with 89,000 employees. In early December, the merger was postponed indefinitely after Sanford Health CEO Kelby Krabbenhoft was abruptly replaced by Bill Gassen after he made anti-mask statements.

COVID-19 and Sanford CEO Krabbenhoft
In November 2020, Krabbenhoft said he would not wear a face mask despite the ongoing COVID-19 pandemic, as he claimed he already had the disease. His statement drew criticism and was seen by many as a slap in the face to frontline healthcare workers. Krabbenhoft also said the pandemic was not a crisis during a time in which South Dakota's hospitalizations related to the disease were at all-time highs. On November 24, 2020, the board announced that Krabbenhoft would leave the organization, to be replaced by Bill Gassen.

Fairview Health 
In November 2022, Fairview Health and Sanford Health signed an intent to merge.

Centers of Excellence
Sanford Health has five "centers of excellence": cancer, children's, heart, orthopedics/sports medicine, and women's health.

Children's hospital

Sanford Children's Hospital is a freestanding acute care children's hospital in Sioux Falls, South Dakota. It is affiliated with the University of South Dakota Sanford School of Medicine. The hospital features all private rooms that consist of 118 pediatric beds. It provides comprehensive pediatric specialties and subspecialties to infants, children, teens, and young adults aged 0–21 throughout the region. The hospital has a rooftop helipad and is an ACS verified level II pediatric trauma center, the only one in the state. It features a regional pediatric intensive-care unit and an American Academy of Pediatrics verified level III neonatal intensive care unit.

World Clinics

The Sanford World Clinic initiative, which focuses primarily on international pediatric healthcare, began in 2007. Sanford Children's Clinic Duncan in Oklahoma became the first World Clinic that year.

As of 2017, Sanford operated clinics in China, Ghana, Germany, and Canada.

In January 2018, it was announced that Sanford would establish World Clinics in Costa Rica, Ireland, New Zealand, South Africa, and Vietnam and expand its presence in China and Ghana.

Facilities

Sports facilities
The Sanford Fieldhouse, in Sioux Falls, South Dakota, houses 85,000 square feet of indoor sport fields. There are also batting cages, indoor tracks, and other workout equipment. The Sanford Pentagon, also in Sioux Falls, houses nine basketball courts. Both these buildings were designed with sustainability and building efficiency in mind. Sanford Health worked with JLG Architects on both of them.

Trauma centers 
Sanford Health has many emergency trauma centers across the Midwest. In Sioux Falls, the Sanford USD Medical Center is a board-certified Level II Trauma Center, along with a Level II Pediatric Trauma center. Sanford also has Level II centers in North Dakota and Aberdeen, South Dakota.

In April 2018, Sanford Health's Fargo medical center was designated as a Level I Adult Trauma Center, the only Level I facility between Minneapolis, Seattle, Omaha, and Denver, and the only one in the Dakotas.

Sponsorships 
Sanford is a major sponsor of the Summit League, an NCAA Division I athletic conference whose membership now includes all of the four largest universities in the Dakotas plus one in Nebraska. The conference moved its headquarters in 2018 to a Sanford-owned office complex in Sioux Falls at the company's invitation. Also in that year, regional media reported that Sanford-tied boosters of Augustana University, also located in Sioux Falls, were making a serious attempt to move the school's athletic program from NCAA Division II to the Summit League.

The company also sponsors Sanford MMA (now Kill Cliff FC) as a secondary sponsor.

References 

Companies based in Sioux Falls, South Dakota
Sioux Falls, South Dakota
Fargo, North Dakota
Hospital networks in the United States
Medical and health organizations based in South Dakota